Julie A. Bartling (born July 1, 1958) is a Democratic member of the South Dakota Senate, representing the 26th district since 2004. Previously she was a member of the South Dakota House of Representatives from 2000 through 2004.

Education
Julie Bartling received her education from the following institution:
Diploma, Burke High School, 1976

Political Experience
Julie Bartling has had the following political experience:
Candidate, South Dakota House of Representatives, District 21, 2012
Candidate, South Dakota State Auditor, 2010
Senator, South Dakota State Senate, 2004-2010
Representative, South Dakota State House, 2000-2004

Caucuses/Non-Legislative Committees
Julie Bartling has been a member of the following committees:
Director, Farmer Agricultural Mortgage Corporation, 2003–present

Professional Experience
Julie Bartling has had the following professional experience:
Auditor, Gregory County, South Dakota, 1983-2001
Appointed Deputy Auditor, Gregory County, South Dakota, 1981-1983
Business Owner

Organizations
Julie Bartling has been a member of the following organizations:
Director, RITE Team Association, 2002–present
Member, Herrick American Legion Auxiliary, Post #220, 1976–present
President, South Dakota Association of County Officials, 1999-2000
1st Vice President, South Dakota Association of County Officials, 1998-1999
2nd Vice President, South Dakota Association of County Officials, 1997-1998
Board Member, South Dakota Association of County Officials, 1994-1997

External links
South Dakota Legislature - Julie Bartling official SD Senate website

Project Vote Smart - Senator Julie A. Bartling (SD) profile
Follow the Money - Julie Bartling
2008 2006 2004 Senate campaign contributions
2002 2000 House campaign contributions

References

|-

South Dakota state senators
Members of the South Dakota House of Representatives
1958 births
Living people
Women state legislators in South Dakota
People from Burke, South Dakota
21st-century American politicians
21st-century American women politicians